Raphael Chidi Odogwu (born 28 January 1991) is an Italian footballer who plays as a forward for  club Südtirol.

Club career
Raphael Chidi Odogwu started his professional career with his childhood club Virtus Verona. He later had stints with Real Vicenza, Renate, Altovicentino, and Arzignano before returning to Virtus Verona in 2019. On 24 July 2020 he signed a 2-year contract with Südtirol.

Personal life
Odogwu was born in Italy to a Nigerian father and Italian mother. His father is from the Igbo tribe.

References

External links

1991 births
Living people
Footballers from Verona
Italian people of Nigerian descent
Italian sportspeople of African descent
Italian footballers
Association football forwards
Serie B players
Serie C players
Serie D players
Virtus Verona players
Real Vicenza V.S. players
A.C. Renate players
F.C. Arzignano Valchiampo players
F.C. Südtirol players